Thusharagiri Falls is a waterfall located in Kozhikode district in the Indian state of Kerala, India. 

Two streams originating from the Western Ghats meet here to form the Chalippuzha River. The river diverges into three waterfalls creating a snowy spray, which gives the name, 'Thusharagiri' a word which means the snow-capped mountain. The other two are the Erattumukku falls and Mazhavil Chattam falls.

Thusharagiri bridge 

Thusharagiri bridge is located at Chalippuzha near thusharagiri waterfalls. This is one of the tallest arch bridge in Kerala.

References

External links 
 Thusharagiri Speciality

Waterfalls of Kerala
Thamarassery area
Geography of Kozhikode district